De Maiwand Atalan (nicknamed the Maiwand Champions) is a professional football club from Afghanistan. They play in the Afghanistan Champions League. It was founded in August 2012 by the creation of Afghan Premier League and its players have been chosen through a casting-show called Maidan-E-Sabz (Green Field). Based in the city of Kandahar, club represents  provinces of Kandahar, Helmand, Urozgan, Nimruz and Zabul in the southern region of Afghanistan.

Honours

National
Afghan Premier League
Runners-up (2): 2016, 2017

References

Football clubs in Afghanistan
Kandahar
Association football clubs established in 2012
2012 establishments in Afghanistan